This article is about the particular significance of the year 1702 to Wales and its people.

Incumbents 
Lord Lieutenant of North Wales (Lord Lieutenant of Anglesey, Caernarvonshire, Denbighshire, Flintshire, Merionethshire, Montgomeryshire) – William Stanley, 9th Earl of Derby; (10 June – 5 November 1702)Hugh Cholmondeley, 1st Earl of Cholmondeley (from 2 December)
Lord Lieutenant of Glamorgan, Brecknockshire, Cardiganshire, Carmarthenshire, Monmouthshire, Pembrokeshire, Radnorshire – Thomas Herbert, 8th Earl of Pembroke

Bishop of Bangor –  John Evans
Bishop of Llandaff – William Beaw
Bishop of St Asaph – Edward Jones
Bishop of St Davids – vacant

Events
8 March – Anne, daughter of King James II, comes to the throne of Great Britain. Since her only surviving son had died prior to her accession, there is no prospective Prince of Wales.
5 May – Following a suspension of nearly a year, Edward Jones, Bishop of St Asaph, is allowed to return to his see.
date unknown
The 23rd Regiment of Foot is granted the title The Welsh Regiment of Fuzileers.
An eisteddfod is held at Machynlleth.
Richard Bulkeley, 4th Viscount Bulkeley, succeeds his father, the 3rd Viscount, as Constable of Beaumaris Castle.

Arts and literature

New books
David Maurice – Cynffwrdd i'r gwan Gristion, neu'r gorsen ysig (translation from work of Theophilus Dorrington)

Births
20 May – Thomas Morgan, judge (died 1769)
date unknown
Richard Farrington, antiquary (died 1772)
Humphrey Owen, academic (died 1768)

Deaths
January – James Annesley, 3rd Earl of Anglesey, 31
25 March – Lewis Wogan of Boulston, High Sheriff of Pembrokeshire, about 50
12 May – Elizabeth Gwyn, philanthropist, daughter of Thomas Gwyn of Hay Castle
5 November – William Stanley, 9th Earl of Derby, Lord Lieutenant of North Wales, about 47
December – Sir Charles Kemeys, 3rd Baronet, Governor of Cardiff Castle
date unknown – David Maurice, clergyman and translator, 76

See also
1702 in Scotland

References

1700s in Wales